Venusia inefficax is a moth in the family Geometridae first described by Louis Beethoven Prout in 1938. It is found in China.

References

Moths described in 1938
Venusia (moth)